Kalamu ya Salaam (born March 24, 1947) is an American poet, author, filmmaker, and teacher from the 9th Ward of New Orleans. A well-known activist and social critic, Salaam has spoken out on a number of racial and human rights issues. For years he did radio shows on WWOZ.  Salaam is the co-founder of the NOMMO Literary Society, a weekly workshop for Black writers.

Background
Born Vallery Ferdinand III in New Orleans, Louisiana, he graduated from high school in 1964, joined the U.S. Army and served in Korea. He attended Carleton College (1964–69) and Delgado Junior College, where he earned an Associate Arts degree in business administration. He was the editor of The Black Collegian magazine for 13 years (1970–83), and has written for many publications including Negro Digest/Black World, First World, The Black Scholar, Black Books Bulletin, Callaloo, Catalyst, The Journal of Black Poetry, Nimrod, Coda, Encore, The New Orleans Tribune, Wavelength, The New Orleans Music Magazine, The Louisiana Weekly newspaper. He is co-founder/editor of Runagate Press.

He is the moderator of Neo-Griot, a Black literature information blog.

Selected bibliography
 The Blues Merchant Songs for Blkfolk. New Orleans: BLKARTSOUTH, 1969.
 Hofu ni kwenu: My Fears for You. New Orleans: Ahidiana, 1973.
 Pamoja tutashinda: Together We Will Win. New Orleans: Ahidiana, 1973.
 Ibura. New Orleans: Ahidiana, 1976.
 Tearing the Roof off the Sucker: The Fall of South Africa. New Orleans: Ahidiana, 1977.
 South African Showdown: Divestment Now. New Orleans: Ahidiana, 1978.
 Revolutionary Love: Poems and Essays. New Orleans: Ahidiana-Habari, 1978.
 Herufi: An Alphabet Reader. New Orleans: Ahidiana, 1979.
 Iron Flowers: A Poetic Report on a Visit to Haiti. New Orleans: Ahidiana, 1979.
 Our Women Keep Our Skies from Falling: Six Essays in Support of the Struggle to Smash Sexism and Develop Women. New Orleans: Nkombo, 1980.
 Our Music is No Accident. New Orleans: New Orleans Cultural Foundation, 1988. [Images by Keith Calhoun and Chandra McCormick]
 What is Life? Reclaiming the Black Blues Self. Third World Press: Chicago, 1994.
 Tarzan Can - Not Return to Africa But I Can. 1996.
 He's The Prettiest: A Tribute to Big Chief Allison "Tootie" Montana's 50 Years of Mardi Gras Indian Suiting. New Orleans: New Orleans Museum of Art, 1997.
 360° A Revolution Of Black Poets. Alexandria, Va.: Black Words; New Orleans: Runagate Press, 1998.
 Magic of Juju: An Appreciation of the Black Arts Movement. Third World Press: Chicago, 1998.
 New Orleans Griot: The Tom Dent Reader. UNO Press: New Orleans, 2018.
 Be About Beauty. UNO Press: New Orleans, 2018.

References

External links
Official website
 E. Ethelbert Miller, "Interview with Kalamu ya Salaam", Foreign Policy in Focus, May 15, 2007
 Kalamu ya Salaam: A Primary Bibliography by Jerry W. Ward, Jr.
 Bill Rouselle, "A METRO Salute To Kalamu ya Salaam", Metro Service Group, New Orleans, March 24, 2017.

Writers from New Orleans
Living people
American science fiction writers
African-American novelists
1947 births
American male novelists
American male poets
20th-century American poets
20th-century American male writers
Novelists from Louisiana
African-American poets
20th-century African-American writers
21st-century African-American people
African-American male writers